Sumit Kumar Singh . is currently an independent MLA from Chakai Vidhan Sabha (243) of Jamui district of Bihar and Minister of Science and Technology Department,   in the cabinet of the Government of Bihar.  He is the only independent MLA from Bihar.  This has happened for the first time in Indian history, who has become the lone independent MLA in the whole of Bihar.  Shri Sumit Kumar Singh is also known as Bikki Singh in his area.  He is a popular youth leader from all over the ang state.  He comes from a big political house of Bihar.  His father Late Narendra Singh used to be a strong minister of Bihar.  He has also been a minister of big departments in Bihar from Lalu government to Nitish government till 2015, he was also awarded the President's honor in 2012 for doing better work as agriculture minister.  Apart from this, he had also been the state president of the party LJP of late Ram Vilas Paswan  in 2005.  Sumit Singh's grandfather Late Shrikrishna Singh has also been a minister in the Bihar government, along with he was also a freedom fighter.  Mr. Singh is the third generation of his family to become a minister in the Government of Bihar.  Apart from this, his two other brothers have been MLAs.  Out of which one late Abhay Singh has died.  Sumit Kumar Singh's politics started from 2010 when he reached the Legislative Assembly for the first time from Chakai Vidhan Sabha of Jamui district of Bihar by winning on Jharkhand Mukti Morcha ticket.  He also contested as an independent in 2015 but was not successful.  But in the 2020 assembly elections, the public again elected him as an MLA.  Sumit Kumar Singh is also known as Vikas Purush due to his development work in Sono-Chakai area of ​​his assembly constituency, that is why he remains the favorite of the people despite contesting as an independent every time.

References

Living people
Bihar MLAs 2010–2015
Bihar MLAs 2020–2025
Year of birth missing (living people)
Jharkhand Mukti Morcha politicians